The Sailor's Return is a 1925 British novel by David Garnett. In Victorian England, a black woman "marries" a sailor and faces hostility from the local community in Dorset.

Ballet
In 1947, British choreographer Andrée Howard created The Sailor's Return for Ballet Rambert. It was her second ballet based on Garnett's work, her first being her 1939 work of the same name based on Garnett's Lady into Fox.

Adaptation

In 1978 Euston Films adapted the novel into a film. The film was directed by Jack Gold and starred Tom Bell and Shope Shodeinde.

References

External links
 

1925 British novels
British historical novels
Novels by David Garnett
British novels adapted into films
Novels set in Dorset
Chatto & Windus books